Synemon laeta is a moth in the Castniidae family. It is found along the east coast of Queensland, Australia.

Adults have a brown pattern on their forewings and scarlet hindwings with a brown marginal and submarginal arc. Males show territorial behaviour, chasing other intruding males away.

The larvae feed on Lomandra longifolia. They feed inside the culm of the food plant at ground level.

References

Moths described in 1854
Castniidae